Kaliella barrakporensis is a species of gastropods belonging to the family Chronidae.

The species is found in Africa and Southern Asia.

References

Chronidae
Taxa named by Ludwig Karl Georg Pfeiffer